Werewolves of London is a video game released in 1987 for the ZX Spectrum, Commodore 64 and the Amstrad CPC. It was released on a cassette with the Amstrad version on one side and the Spectrum version on the other, this scheme being referred to as "Flippy". The game used the same engine as Viz Design's (consisting of Steve Howard and Paul Smith) other game Frankenstein Junior which was released by Codemasters in the same year. The game was released two years late (and largely unfinished) and was as a budget title, as intended. Publisher Ariolasoft ceased trading and the game was subsequently released by Mastertronic. It was also released in Spain by Dro Soft.

The game is set in London and the plot is to kill each of eight members of an aristocratic family who put a curse on the main character, resulting in his daily transformation into a werewolf.

Gameplay
The game is played from a side-on 45-degree view, letting the player not only move left and right, but up and down. The character can also jump. The player starts off as a human who must roam the streets of London (including the London Underground and Hyde Park), and pick up items which will help the player in certain tasks. When the timer hits midnight, the player character transforms into a werewolf. The player must then track down each of the 8 enemy characters and kill, and optionally, eat their bodies, while avoiding being shot or captured by the police.

The game involved more strategy elements than the traditional 8-bit platform game, as the game changed mechanics and difficulty in response to the player's actions. For example, the more people that are attacked by the werewolf, the more active the police become. The Hyde Park location is locked during the night, and a ticket is needed to enter the subway (although rush gate can be done). When the Werewolf is sent to prison when 'touched' by a police officer with handcuffs. After transforms back to a human, the player is released or the player can escape by finding a crowbar to escape through the sewers (a torch is needed to see in the dark). Eating family members and NPC gives extra health, but being shot results in a constant health drop (in the form of a blood-bag icon). Finding bandages can stem the blood flow. If the blood-bag reaches empty, the game is over.

Audiovisual production
The sound in the game consists of basic sound effects in a single sound channel including footsteps, the dripping of blood, and a crunching sound when the werewolf mauls its victims. While the Spectrum version featured only a simple beeper tune on the title screen, there were three pieces of two channel music on the Amstrad CPC and C64 versions; one for the menu, and two for the human/werewolf stages. The music seamlessly blended with each other when the character morphed between stages. The CPC version of the game used 'Mode 0' resolution (160 x 200) and 16 colours, while the Spectrum used the standard 256×192 resolution. The CPC had up to eight characters (including the player character) on screen at any one time, the Spectrum could have up to five (including the player character) and the C64 could have up to four. The sprites and backgrounds on the Spectrum were completely different from those in the other versions.

Reception
Your Sinclair magazine said it "doesn't work at all – what was envisaged as an atmospheric arcade adventure ... is just an aimless chase-about". It received a front page spread and a full page preview in an earlier release.

References

External links
 

1987 video games
Amstrad CPC games
Commodore 64 games
Werewolf video games
ZX Spectrum games
Video games developed in the United Kingdom
Video games set in London
Mastertronic games
Ariolasoft games
Single-player video games